1755 is the eleventh full-length album by Portuguese gothic metal band Moonspell, released on 3 November 2017. Unlike previous albums, it is entirely sung in Portuguese. It is a concept album, detailing the story of the 1755 Lisbon earthquake.

This album was recorded in Antfarm Studios and Poison Apple Studios, produced and mixed by Tue Madsen, noted for working with Meshuggah, The Haunted, Dark Tranquillity, Dir En Grey, and Die Apokalyptischen Reiter. Cover artwork was designed by João Diogo. It includes guest performances in some songs, including vocals by Paulo Bragança on the track 'In Tremor Dei'.

Track listing 
All songs written by Moonspell, all lyrics by Fernando Ribeiro (except "Lanterna dos Afogados").

Personnel 
Fernando Ribeiro – vocals
Ricardo Amorim – guitars
Aires Pereira – bass
Pedro Paixão – keyboards
Miguel Gaspar – drums

Additional musicians 
 Silvia Guerreiro – choir vocals
 Mariangela Demurtas – choir vocals
 Carmen Susana Simões – choir vocals
 Jon Phipps – virtual orchestration
 Martin Lopez – darbuka on "1755"
 Paulo Bragança – vocals on "In Tremor Dei"

Production 
 Adriano Esteves – logo
 Tiago Canadas – engineering, recording
 Jon Phipps – pre-production, arrangements
 João Diogo – artwork
 Tue Madsen – producer, mixing, mastering
 Paulo Mendes – photography

Charts

References 

2017 albums
Moonspell albums
Napalm Records albums
Albums produced by Tue Madsen